The Treaty is a 1991 Irish historical television film written by Brian Phelan and directed by Jonathan Lewis.

The film is about the Anglo-Irish Treaty that Michael Collins bargained for with the British government in 1921. Low budget and originally made for television, this is a RTÉ - Thames Television co-production.

Brendan Gleeson plays Michael Collins, Barry McGovern plays Éamon de Valera, Bosco Hogan plays Erskine Childers, John Warner plays George V, Julian Fellowes plays Winston Churchill, and Ian Bannen plays David Lloyd George.

References

External links
 
 

1991 films
Irish biographical drama films
Irish television films
1990s biographical drama films
Historiography of Ireland
Irish War of Independence films
Films set in Dublin (city)
Cultural depictions of George V
Films about Winston Churchill
Cultural depictions of David Lloyd George
Cultural depictions of Michael Collins (Irish leader)
Cultural depictions of Éamon de Valera
Films set in 1919
Films set in 1920
Films set in 1921
1991 drama films
1990s English-language films